Wileyville is an unincorporated village in Wetzel County, West Virginia, United States. It lies at an elevation of 804 feet (245 m).  There is a grocery store at Wileyville. Wileyville once had a post office with ZIP code 26186, which closed on March 10, 2007. The post office is now located at Littleton, with both Wileyville and Littleton having the ZIP code of 26581.

References

Unincorporated communities in Wetzel County, West Virginia
Unincorporated communities in West Virginia